Ban Khu Bua station is a railway station located in Khu Bua Subdistrict, Ratchaburi City, Ratchaburi.

Services 
 Ordinary 251/252 Bang Sue Junction-Prachuap Khiri Khan-Bang Sue Junction
 Ordinary 254 Lang Suan-Thon Buri

References 
 
 

Railway stations in Thailand
Ratchaburi province